Christian Church of Sumba is Calvinist church in Indonesia, a member of World Communion of Reformed Churches. The denomination was established on 15 January 1947. Today, the church has congregations in various cities outside the island of Sumba.

There are churches in Sumba, Flores, Rote-Ndao, Kupang, Timor, Bali, Java, Sulawesi.

It has 550,000 members, the majority of the Christian population in Sumba in 2004. The church has been growing steadily.

In 2012, the church had approximately 600,000 members and 712 congregations.
In 1907, Dutch Reformed started the mission in Sumba and they founded a number of congregations. By the 1940s, there were 5,000 Christians in Sumba. The official founding date is 1947. The church adheres to the Heidelberg Catechism

References 

1947 establishments in the Dutch East Indies
Calvinist denominations established in the 20th century
Members of the World Communion of Reformed Churches
Reformed denominations in Indonesia
Christian organizations established in 1949
Sumba